The 23rd New Brunswick Legislative Assembly represented New Brunswick between February 18, 1875, and May 14, 1878.

Samuel Leonard Tilley served as Lieutenant-Governor of New Brunswick.

William Wedderburn was chosen as speaker.

The Conservative Party led by George E. King formed the government.

In 1876, an informal accommodation was reached with Roman Catholics in the province with respect to religious instruction in schools. Where the arrangement was agreeable to the local school board, religious instruction could be carried out in buildings owned by the Church and rented to the province for use as public schools.

History

Members 

Notes:

References 
The Canadian parliamentary companion for 1875, HJ Morgan

Terms of the New Brunswick Legislature
1875 establishments in New Brunswick
1878 disestablishments in New Brunswick